Melbourne Beach is a town in Brevard County, Florida. The population was 3,101 at the 2010 United States Census. It is part of the Palm Bay–Melbourne–Titusville Metropolitan Statistical Area.

History

The Ais Indians resided in the area in pre-Columbian times. In 2010, a midden near Aquarina included a burial ground for a chief and two handmaidens.

It has been suggested that Juan Ponce de León landed near Melbourne Beach in 1513, where he then became the first European to set foot in Florida. A determination of this was made by a historian in the 1990s, who believed that the spot was "within five to eight nautical miles" on the barrier island with a proposed name of Ponce de León Island. However, this suggestion has not been met with wide acceptance from historians who state that de Leon's landing place cannot be known within a leeway of less than a hundred miles or so. A statue of Ponce de León was erected at "Juan Ponce de León Landing" in Melbourne Beach to commemorate his discovery.

Melbourne Beach is Brevard County's oldest beach community.

In 1879, a hotel, the Oak Lodge, was built for researchers and naturalists on a  location near Aquarina.

In 1921, the Melbourne Causeway was built, connecting Melbourne Beach to the mainland via the town of Indialantic. In 1923 it was incorporated as a town.

In 1928, Harry J. Brooks, attempting to set a long distance record, crashed a Ford Flivver off the coast of Melbourne Beach, resulting in his death.

The town's population oscillated until World War II, when it began growing steadily. Currently, it is largely residential, with an elementary school, some businesses, and many condominiums in the unincorporated areas to the north and south.

In 2007, it was voted one of ten best bargain retirement spots in America.

In 2016, a Publix located four miles south of Melbourne Beach sold one of the winning tickets in the $1.3 billion Powerball.

Geography

It is situated on the barrier island that separates the Indian River Lagoon from the Atlantic Ocean. Melbourne Beach is bordered by the town of Indialantic to the north.

According to the United States Census Bureau, the town has a total area of 1.3 square miles (3.3 km). 1.0 square miles (2.7 km) of it is land and 0.2 square miles (0.6 km) of it (19.53%) is water.

Climate

Fauna

Shorebirds include black-bellied plovers, red knots (winter), gannets, seabirds (offshore), and red-throated loons (winter).

Demographics

As of the census of 2000, there were 3,335 people, 1,422 households, and 992 families residing in the town. The racial makeup of the town was 97.51% White, 0.09% Black, 0.12% Native American, 0.99% Asian, 0.24% from other races, and 1.05% from two or more races. Hispanic or Latino of any race were 2.28% of the population.

There were 1,422 households, out of which 25.7% had children under the age of 18 living with them, 61.7% were married couples living together, 5.5% had a female householder with no husband present, and 30.2% were non-families. 23.9% of all households were made up of individuals, and 11.7% had someone living alone who was 65 years of age or older. The average household size was 2.35 and the average family size was 2.77.

In the town, the population was spread out, with 20.1% under the age of 18, 4.0% from 18 to 24, 24.6% from 25 to 44, 28.9% from 45 to 64, and 22.5% who were 65 years of age or older. The median age was 46 years. For every 100 females, there were 103.2 males. For every 100 females age 18 and over, there were 99.3 males.

2015

 the largest self-reported ancestry groups in Melbourne Beach, Florida are:

Government

In 2007, the town had a taxable real estate base of $371.45 million.

Economy

Personal income

The median income for a household in the town was $87,035, and the median income for a family was $62,139. Males had a median income of $46,424 versus $34,028 for females. The per capita income for the town was $31,489. About 1.6% of families and 3.8% of the population were below the poverty line, including none of those under age 18 and 2.2% of those age 65 or over.

Median home value was $321,498.00 in 2010.

Melbourne Beach is second in Brevard County for per capita income and 124 out of 887 places.

Industry

Tourism

Coconut Point Park is a  community beachside park and sea turtle nesting site. The park is listed in the state of Florida Great Florida Birding Trail.

Points of interest

 Melbourne Beach Pier
 Old Melbourne Beach Town Hall
 Ryckman Park

Notable people

 Bobby Dall, musician, bass player for rock band Poison
 Jorja Fox, American actress and producer
 Doug Flutie, football player
 James Henry Gillis, Rear Admiral
 Caroline Marks, Olympic surfer
 Norma Metrolis, baseball player
 Pat Neshek, pitcher for the St. Louis Cardinals
 Homer Rodeheaver, music arranger for Billy Sunday; later formed a subdivision in town, "Christian Colony," for retired evangelists

References

External links

 
 Melbourne Beach 32951, community website
 History of Melbourne Beach
 Melbourne Beach Wave - Community News

 
Populated places established in 1883
Towns in Brevard County, Florida
Towns in Florida
Populated coastal places in Florida on the Atlantic Ocean
Beaches of Brevard County, Florida
Beaches of Florida